Walter Huke or Hewke was an English priest and academic in the late 15th and early 16th centuries.

Huke graduated Bachelor of Canon Law in 1490. He was ordained in 1491. He was Rector of Holywell, Cambridgeshire (then in Huntingdonshire) from 1500 and Master of Trinity Hall, Cambridge from 1512, holding both posts until his death in 1517.

References

Fellows of Trinity Hall, Cambridge
Masters of Trinity Hall, Cambridge
1517 deaths
15th-century English Roman Catholic priests
16th-century English Roman Catholic priests